The Ulindi River red colobus (Piliocolobus lulindicus) is a species of red colobus monkey endemic to the Democratic Republic of the Congo. It is named after the Ulindi River.

It was formerly considered conspecific with Foa's red colobus (P. foai), but it has been tentatively recognized as a distinct species by the IUCN Red List and the American Society of Mammalogists.

It is found in lowland forests east of the Lualaba River, with the Albertine Rift serving as an eastern barrier to the species range. It is found as far south as the Lukuga River and north to the Lowa River. It is threatened by habitat loss and hunting, with it being frequently hunted for bushmeat due to its large size, and large tracts of its habitat being deforested for farmland.

References 

Ulindi River red colobus
Mammals of the Democratic Republic of the Congo
Endemic fauna of the Democratic Republic of the Congo
Ulindi River red colobus
Taxa named by Paul Matschie